VQ may refer to:

 Nissan VQ engine, an automobile engine
 Holden VQ Statesman/Caprice, an automobile
 Vector quantization, in signal processing
 Ventilation Quotient or Ventilation/perfusion scan, in medicine
 Veritable Quandary, a restaurant in Portland, Oregon, US
 United States Virgin Islands (FIPS 10-4 country code VQ)
 The Vice Quadrant, a 2015 album by Steam Powered Giraffe
 Novoair (IATA code VQ), an airline from Bangladesh

See also

 
 QV (disambiguation)
 V (disambiguation)
 Q (disambiguation)